Christopher Rouse may refer to:
Christopher Rouse (composer) (1949–2019), music composer
Christopher Rouse (film editor) (born 1958), American film editor